Vian (also Romanized as Vīān, Veyān, and Vīyān) is a village in Sabzdasht Rural District, in the Central District of Kabudarahang County, Hamadan Province, Iran. At the 2006 census, its population was 3,870, in 871 families.

References 

Populated places in Kabudarahang County